Theodor Alexander Corbeanu (born May 17, 2002) is a Canadian professional soccer player who plays as a forward for 2. Bundesliga side Arminia Bielefeld, on loan from Wolverhampton Wanderers, and the Canada national team.

Early life
Born in Hamilton, Ontario, Corbeanu began playing house league soccer at the age of five with local club Quinndale Youth Soccer as a goalkeeper, but soon switched to a forward role. At youth level, he later played for local clubs Mount Hamilton SC, Hamilton Sparta SC, Saltfleet SC and Givova Academy. In late 2016, after a successful trial, Corbeanu joined the academy of Toronto FC.

Club career

Toronto FC
In 2018, he played for Toronto FC III in League1 Ontario. He scored two goals in a 6–1 victory over Toronto Skillz FC on May 21, 2018.

Wolverhampton Wanderers
Having left Toronto FC in August 2018, Corbeanu was unsuccessful in a trial for English club Leicester City, but was later offered a scholarship with the academy of Wolverhampton Wanderers, in which he represented the club's U16 and U18 sides. In the summer of 2019, he joined the first team on their pre-season trip in China, before joining the club's U23 development squad in 2020.

After playing nine games for the Wolves U23 team, in which he scored four goals, Corbeanu signed a professional contract with the first team in October 2020. He subsequently became a regular fixture on the Wolves bench, eventually making his Premier League debut appearance for the club on May 16, 2021, coming on as a second-half substitute in their game away to Tottenham Hotspur, which ended with a 2–0 defeat.

Loan to Sheffield Wednesday
On August 2, 2021, Corbeanu joined EFL League One club Sheffield Wednesday on a season-long loan. He made his Owls debut in a single-goal defeat at Morecambe on August 28. On November 2, Corbeanu scored his first senior professional goal, with the opener in a 3–0 victory over Sunderland.

Loan to Milton Keynes Dons
On January 6, 2022, Corbeanu was recalled from his loan early by Wolves and sent back out on loan to another League One club, Milton Keynes Dons, for the remainder of the 2021–22 season. He made his debut on January 11 in a 1–0 home win over rivals AFC Wimbledon, and four days later scored his first goal for the club in a 2–1 away win over Portsmouth. Corbeanu went on to make 17 appearances for MK Dons as the club secured a third-placed play-off finish.

Loan to Blackpool
On July 28, 2022, Corbeanu joined EFL Championship club Blackpool on loan for the duration of the 2022–23 season. He made his debut for the club the next day as second-half substitute in a single-goal victory over Reading at Bloomfield Road. On August 20, Corbeanu scored his first goal for Blackpool, netting their first in an eventual 3–3 draw against Burnley. On January 3, 2023, he was re-called by Wolves after suffering an ankle injury, ending his time at the club.

Loan to Arminia Bielefeld
On January 20, 2023, 2. Bundesliga side Arminia Bielefeld announced they had signed Corbeanu on a loan from Wolves for the remainder of the season.

International career
After not being selected for the Canadian U15 team, Corbeanu contacted the Romanian federation, who were aware of his progress. He began playing for Romania at U16 and U17 level, scoring twice in his first match with the U16 side against the Republic of Ireland. After two years with the Romanian youth teams, he left in 2019, wanting to remain eligible for Canada at senior level.

He was called up to the Canadian senior team for the first time in December 2020, for a January training camp, but later withdrew due to club commitments with Wolves. He officially joined the senior squad for the first time in March 2021, when he was called up ahead of Canada's 2022 World Cup qualification matches against Bermuda and the Cayman Islands. He made his debut as a 77th-minute substitute against Bermuda on March 25, 2021, scoring four minutes into his debut with Canada's fifth goal in a 5–1 victory.

In June 2021, Corbeanu was named in Canada's preliminary squad for the 2021 CONCACAF Gold Cup. On July 1, 2021, he was named in the final squad that would participate at the tournament. In December 2021, Corbeanu was named the 2021 Canada Soccer Youth Player of the Year.

Career statistics

Club

International

Scores and results list Canada's goal tally first, score column indicates score after each Corbeanu goal.

Honours
Individual
Canada Soccer Youth Player of the Year: 2021

References

External links
 

2002 births
Living people
Canadian people of Romanian descent 
Canadian soccer players
Soccer players from Hamilton, Ontario
Romanian footballers
Association football forwards
Canada men's international soccer players
Romania youth international footballers
2021 CONCACAF Gold Cup players
English Football League players
Toronto FC players
Wolverhampton Wanderers F.C. players
Sheffield Wednesday F.C. players
Milton Keynes Dons F.C. players
Blackpool F.C. players
Arminia Bielefeld players
Canadian expatriate soccer players
Romanian expatriate footballers
Canadian expatriate sportspeople in England
Romanian expatriate sportspeople in England
Expatriate footballers in England
Canadian expatriate sportspeople in Germany
Romanian expatriate sportspeople in Germany
Expatriate footballers in Germany